Petra Martínez Pérez (born 24 June 1944) is a Spanish actress who has a long career on stage, film and television.

She was in the cast of the 1967 stage play Twelfth Night, by William Shakespeare. In 1968, she married her eventual longtime domestic and artistic partner Juan Margallo in Gibraltar in a ceremony without legal validity to Spanish authorities (their marriage was legally formalised circa 2018).

In 2011, Uroc Teatro, founded by Petra Martínez and Juan Margallo, received the Medalla de Oro al Mérito en las Bellas Artes. In 2012 she was nominated to Premio Luna de Islantilla for Best Actress at Festival Internacional de Cine Bajo la Luna Islantilla Cinefórum for the film Libre directo.

In 2014, she featured in the television series La que se avecina, playing Fina.

In 2017 she received the Premio Jiennenses de Cultura, given by Diario Jaén. On March 18, 2017 she earned the 'San Pancracio' Honorary Award at the  alongside the actors Roberto Álamo, Laia Marull, Carlos Santos, Ana Castillo, and directors Koldo Serra and Salvador Calvo and the stage designer Marcelo Pacheco.

On the same year she created an Instagram account because she was usurped so many times.

In 2021, she starred in David Martín de los Santos's That Was Life as María. Her performance clinched her a Feroz Award for Best Actress and a nomination for Best Actress at the 36th Goya Awards.

Filmography

Film

References

External links 
 

Spanish stage actresses
Spanish film actresses
Spanish television actresses
People from Linares, Jaén
20th-century Spanish actresses
21st-century Spanish actresses
Living people

1944 births
Actresses from Andalusia